The 2018 4 Nations Cup was a women's ice hockey tournament held in Saskatoon, Saskatchewan, Canada. It was the 23rd edition of the 4 Nations Cup.

Results

Preliminary round

All times are local (UTC−6).

Bronze medal game

Gold medal game

Statistics

Final standings

Scoring leaders
Only the top ten skaters, sorted by points, then goals, are included in this list.

GP = Games played; G = Goals; A = Assists; Pts = Points; PIM = Penalties in minutes; POS = Position
Source: Hockey Canada

Goaltending leaders
Only the top four goaltenders, based on save percentage, who played at least 40% of their team's minutes, are included in this list.

TOI = Time on ice (minutes:seconds); SA = Shots against; GA = Goals against; GAA = Goals against average; Sv% = Save percentage; SO = Shutouts
Source: Hockey Canada

External links
Official website

2018
2018–19 in American women's ice hockey
2018–19 in Canadian women's ice hockey
2018–19 in Finnish ice hockey
2018–19 in Swedish ice hockey
2018–19 in women's ice hockey
2018
Sports competitions in Saskatoon